Megachile incerta is a species of bee in the family Megachilidae. It was described by Radoszkowski in 1876.

References

Incerta
Insects described in 1876